Garrard Conley (born ) is an American author and LGBTQ activist known for his autobiography Boy Erased: A Memoir, recounting his childhood as part of a fundamentalist family in Arkansas that enrolled him in conversion therapy. The book was adapted for the 2018 film, Boy Erased.

Early life and education 
Conley was raised first in Cherokee Village and then later in Mountain Home, Arkansas. His father is a Southern Baptist preacher and former car salesman. Garrard "spent years struggling to reconcile his sexuality with his faith". His family had a house on Lake Thunderbird where Conley would spend time on their pontoon boat.

He attended Lyon College for a semester before returning home after being outed to his parents by a student who had raped Conley. Conley was sent to Love in Action to undergo conversion therapy—the controversial pseudoscientific practice of trying to change someone's sexual orientation from homosexual to heterosexual using psychological or spiritual interventions—in 2004. At Love in Action, he underwent treatments by John Smid, who later left the organization, disavowed conversion therapy, announced he was still gay and stated he had "never met a man who experienced a change from homosexual to heterosexual."

Career 
In 2016, Conley taught English literature at the American College of Sofia in Bulgaria. He is the author of Boy Erased: A Memoir, which was based on his experiences at Love in Action. The book was later adapted into the 2018 film Boy Erased by Joel Edgerton, with Lucas Hedges playing Conley. He leveraged his newfound fame to "educate the public about the abusive practice of conversion therapy". Conley released a four-episode podcast titled UnErased: The History of Conversion Therapy in America shortly before the release of the film. In 2018, Conley led GrubStreet's Memoir Incubator program. He has continued to travel worldwide telling his story: in 2019, he presented to Southern Utah University, Equality Utah, venues in Germany and Switzerland, and gave a keynote speech for Iowa Safe Schools.

In June 2019, to mark the 50th anniversary of the Stonewall riots, an event widely considered a watershed moment in the modern LGBTQ rights movement, Queerty named him one of the Pride50 "trailblazing individuals who actively ensure society remains moving towards equality, acceptance and dignity for all queer people". Conley currently holds an Assistant Professor of Creative Writing position at Kennesaw State University.

Personal life 
Conley resides in New York City with his husband.

References

External links

21st-century American male writers
21st-century American memoirists
American gay writers
Gay memoirists
Writers from Arkansas
LGBT people from Arkansas
People self-identified as ex-ex-gay
People from Mountain Home, Arkansas